Zoé Maria Chatzidakis is a mathematician who works as a director of research at the École Normale Supérieure in Paris, France. Her research concerns model theory and difference algebra. She was invited to give the Tarski Lectures in 2020, though the lectures were postponed due to the COVID-19 pandemic.

Education and employment 
Chatzidakis earned her Ph.D. in 1984 from Yale University, under the supervision of Angus Macintyre, with a dissertation on the model theory of profinite groups. She is Senior researcher and team director in Algebra and Geometry in the Département de mathématiques et applications de l'École Normale Supérieure.

Honors and awards 
She was the 2013 winner of the Leconte Prize, and was an invited speaker at the International Congress of Mathematicians in 2014. She was named MSRI Chern Professor for Fall 2020.

References

External links
Home page

Year of birth missing (living people)
Living people
Model theorists
French mathematicians
French women mathematicians
Yale Graduate School of Arts and Sciences alumni
Tarski lecturers